Auchendavy was a Roman fort on the Antonine Wall in Scotland. Much of the site archeology was destroyed by the builders of the Forth and Clyde Canal. Between Bar Hill and Balmuildy the wall roughly follows the southern bank of the River Kelvin. The site of the fort is north of Kirkintilloch's northern border. It can be seen as a mound mid-way between the Forth and Clyde Canal and the road.

Sir George Macdonald wrote about the excavation of the site. He says, "Auchendavy is distinguished for the large number of antiquities found in and about it." "About it" includes Shirva Farm in Twechar where finds such as several tombstones were found.

Context
Many Roman forts along the wall held garrisons of around 500 men. Larger forts like Castlecary and Birrens had a nominal cohort of 1000 men but probably sheltered women and children as well although the troops were not allowed to marry. There is likely too to have been large communities of civilians around the site.

Altars
A centurion called Marcus Cocceius Firmus dedicated as many as five altars found at Auchendavy. He was a soldier with the Second Augusta Legion. A sandstone altar to Jupiter and Victory was found in a pit to the south-west of the Roman fort at Auchendavy. There is also an altar to Silvanus. Similarly, a sandstone altar, dedicated to the Presiding Spirit of the Land of Britain, was found near Auchendavy fort. Again a sandstone altar to Diana and Apollo, was found near Auchendavy fort. Yet another altar to Mars was also discovered. It also has dedications to: Minerva, parade-ground goddesses, Hercules, Epona and Victory.

Other Finds
A distance slab by the 20th Legion Valiant was found. A fragment of a male torso was found too.

Gordon and others speak of coins; a gold solidus of Trajan is mentioned. The ballista bullets are said to have been upwards of fifty in number. Two iron mallets were also found.

Many other artefacts have also been found at Shirva, near Twechar.

References

Forts of the Antonine Wall
History of East Dunbartonshire